Horia Brenciu (born Horea Augustus Brenciu  on 27 August 1972 in Brașov) is a Romanian singer, television host for the Romanian version of Dancing with the Stars, entertainer, and philanthropist. He studied at National College Andrei Şaguna from Braşov, then he continued to Şcoala Populară de Artă Braşov, at piano and canto class, and in 1998 he finished The Theater Academy in Bucharest.

At 18 years old he started his musical career by singing with the piano in his own band, "Apropo". In 1993, he entered into the world of television as the host for a popular show, at that time called Robingo at TVR. In the following years he was a prominent TV presenter, and he was the host of some kids' shows, such as TIP TOP MINITOP and KIKI RIKI MIKI (1998–2001). In 2002, he created one of the most important brands in Romania, HB Media, and from 2004 to 2010, he was the planner of Stars on Mariott and other popular shows for New Year's Eve. From 2003, he made a stand by creating "Cabaret Nights at Hilton", cabaret shows which have been enjoyed by international cycus stars and some Romanian celebrities.

In 2002, Horia Brenciu did the first step for HB Orchestra, a powerful project very active in the background for many artists in Romania. A project with thousands of concerts and live acts, at present the project with Julie Mayaya, the winner from Vocea României can be watched at Antena 1 in the show Serviciul Român de Comedie. In 2007 Brenciu released his first album, 35, and in 2008 he received some awards from Radio Romania International in "The best male voice" category.

In 1997 Walt Disney Pictures Romania chose the artist to sing the main theme of the animated series Aladdin.

TV show
Robingo
Tip Top Minitop
Kiki Riki Miki
Ora 6 fix
Sarabanda
Național TV Bingo Liberty
Neața
Neața în Epoca de piatră
Gong Show
Înfruntarea
Asul din Mânecă
Vocea României (coach) (seasons 1–3, 9)
Te cunosc de undeva! (judge) (season 5)
X Factor (judge) (season 4–8)
Masked Singer România (judge) (season 1-2)

Songs
 "Funky Party"
 "Cine ești tu?"
 "La la la"
 "Lucruri simple"
 "La radio"
 "La fel"
 "Septembrie, luni"
 "It's you" (feat. Kamara)
 "Close to me"
 "Love is.." (feat. Cristi Cretu)
 "Prolog"
 "Hello"
"Sunt cine vreau sa fiu"
"O noua zi"
"Do what you like"
"Tu"

References

Horia Brenciu Media Entertainment

Interview
 Horia Brenciu: "Nici acum nu sunt un copil cuminte“, 8 September 2010, Raluca Moisă, Adevărul
 Horia Brenciu: fost karaoke-man, acum omul-orchestră, 5 March 2011, Magda Spiridon, Mihnea-Petru Pârvu, Evenimentul zilei
 Horia Brenciu: "Sunt ca o masă de Crăciun", 16 March 2012, Anca Simionescu, Evenimentul zilei

Romanian television personalities
1972 births
Living people
21st-century Romanian male singers
21st-century Romanian singers